Jae-young, also spelled Jae-yeong, is a Korean unisex given name. Its meaning differs based on the hanja used to write each syllable of the name. There are 20 hanja with the reading "jae" and 34 hanja with the reading "young" on the South Korean government's official list of hanja which may be registered for use in given names.

People with this name include:

Entertainers
Jung Jae-young (born Jung Ji-hyun, 1970), South Korean male actor
Chung Jae-young, stage name J (born 1977), South Korean female singer
Park Hee-von (born Park Jae-young, 1983), South Korean actress
Lee Jae-young, stage name Bahnus, South Korean male composer and producer

Sportspeople
Yoon Jae-young (born 1983), South Korean male table tennis player
Oh Ju-won (born Oh Jae-young, 1985), South Korean male relief pitcher
Shin Jae-young (born 1989), South Korean male baseball pitcher
Lee Jae-yeong (born 1996), South Korean female volleyball player

Other
Protasius Hong Jaeyeong (died 1790s), Joseon Dynasty Christian, named one of the Korean Martyrs
Kim Jae-young (born 1966), South Korean female writer

See also
List of Korean given names

References

Korean unisex given names